Veli Behruz Çinici (1932 – October 18, 2011) was a Turkish architect.

He graduated from Istanbul Technical University Faculty of Architecture in 1954, and worked as a lecturer in the same faculty between 1954 and 1961.  He founded his first workshop with Ayhan Tayman in 1954 in Istanbul.  In 1956, he won first prize at Erzurum Atatürk University Campus Planning Competition together with Enver Tokay, Hayati Tabanlıoğlu, Ayhan Tayman.

He also won first prize for the Ankara Petrol Ofisi Management Building (1957; with Ayhan Tayman), Ankara Devlet Su İşleri General Directorate Building (1958; with Enver Tokay and Teoman Doruk) and İstanbul Eminönü Bazaar Center and Office Complex (1959). All of these were completed apart from the DSI General Directorate Building.

In 1960, he began working with Altuğ Çinici (his wife). In 1961, after winning the METU (Middle East Technical University) Campus Competition they  moved their workshop to Ankara in 1962. After this date until 1980 he designed mostly METU Campus structures located in an area of 500,000 m2.

Important Projects

Middle East Technical University Campus Planning Ankara (1961-1980)
Planning the most important and appropriate to the realities of the period, the 'piece construction' system is applied. According to at least 20 years into the future planned system could be made gradually.
Structural members are divisive and installation inclusive functions.
Instead of easily destroyed, wanting maintenance and repair coatings, often naked and durable materials are selected.
Bare concrete techniques developed here first time in Turkey.

Academic Units of METU
Faculty of Administrative Sciences 
Faculty of Architecture 
Faculty of Science 
Faculty of Education 
Faculty of Engineering 
Faculty of Agriculture

TBMM (Turkish Grand National Assembly) Mosque Complex, Ankara (1986–1989)
Separated from ordinary mosque architecture suggests a new design.
Large part of the mosque is integrated into the sloping terrain.
Transparent to the qibla wall, domeless, has no minaret.
In 1995, International Aga Khan Award was awarded for unique  Architecture.

Other Projects
 Diyarbakir University Campus Planning, Diyarbakir (1970)
 Binevler Housing, Çorum (1971)
 Capa Holiday Village Project, Muğla (1971)
 Iran Embassy School, Iran (1975)
 TBMM Public Relations Building, Ankara (1978)
 Kızılay General Directorate Building Competition Project, Ankara (1980)
 Yacht Harbour and Marina Hotel Project, Trablusgarp (1982)
 Naciye Sultan Complex, Istanbul (1983)
 TBMM Housing Complex, Ankara (1984)
 Soyak Complex, Istanbul (1986)
 International Taksim Square Arrangement Competition, Istanbul (1987)
 Selimiye Environment Arrangement, Istanbul (1988)
 Platin Complex, Istanbul (1993)
 Alka Complex, Istanbul (1993)

References 

"Odtulu", no:48 January 2012. Access: 1 June 2014. Odtulu Journal

Arkiv Behruz Çinici

1932 births
2011 deaths
Turkish architects